The Maltese Challenge League (referred to as the BOV Challenge League for sponsorship reasons) is the second-highest division in Maltese football, behind the Maltese Premier League. The First Division was the precursor of the present Premier League until the latter was revamped for the 1980–81 season with the Maltese Challenge League instituted for the 2020–21 season following the premature end of the previous season due to the COVID-19 pandemic.

Format 

Since the 2022–23 season, the league is made up of eighteen teams. Over the course of the season, each team plays twice against the others in the league, resulting in each team completing thirty-four games in total. Three points are awarded for a win, one for a draw, and zero for a loss. The teams are ranked in the table by:
 Total points gained

In the need of a tie-breaker, a play-off game is played. At the end of the season, the top two teams are directly promoted to the Premier League; an additional place is reserved for the winner of the relegation play-off between the twelfth-placed Premier League team and the third-placed Maltese Challenge League side. The four lowest-finishing teams are relegated to the National Amateur League.

Venues

Results

References

External links 
 First Division on Malta Football Association

 
2
Second level football leagues in Europe